Attracta is a 1983 Irish drama film directed by Kieran Hickey, co-produced by Douglas Kennedy, and starring Wendy Hiller, Kate Thompson and Joe McPartland. It was based on a short story by William Trevor.

Premise
An elderly schoolteacher reflects on her past.

Cast
 Wendy Hiller as Attracta 
 Kate Thompson as The young Attracta 
 Joe McPartland as Mr. Purce 
 John Kavanagh as Mr. Devereux 
 Kate Flynn as Aunt Emmeline 
 Cathleen Delany as Sarah Crookham 
 Deirdre Donnelly as Geraldine Carey 
 Christopher Casson as Mr. Jameson 
 Emma McGrane as Attracta at 11 years 
 Aiden Grennell as Archdeacon Flower 
 Seamus Forde as Mr. Ayrie 
 Jane Brennan as Penelope Vade 
 Martina Stanley as Maisie
 Alan Stanford as Doctor Friendman

References

External links
 
 Attracta at Irish Film & TV Research online

1983 films
1983 drama films
English-language Irish films
Films based on works by William Trevor
1980s English-language films